The 2007–08 season was Football Club Internazionale Milano's 99th in existence and 92nd consecutive season in the top flight of Italian football. This season led Internazionale to celebrate, on 9 March 2008, its centenary. The club commemorated his foundation on the previous day with a party in San Siro, in which supporters and former players have taken part.

Season overview
On August 19, 2007, Inter faced Roma in Supercoppa Italiana losing on penalties. 9 months later, Roberto Mancini's side celebrated instead the win of Scudetto over the same rival, with 85 points to 82. Inter conquested the title, for third consecutive season, in last Serie A match beating Parma for 2–0: both goals are of Zlatan Ibrahimović, who had scored for other 15 times during the whole league. For Parma, it was the first relegation to B after 18 consecutive seasons in top flight.

In late May 2008, after have lost an other trophy against Roma, Mancini is fired by Moratti. Days later, the club announced that his coach was sacked for the statement after Inter-Liverpool of previous 11 March: this game had marked the side's Champions League failure.

Players

Squad information

From youth squad

Transfers

In

Out

Club

Non-playing staff

Pre-season and friendlies

Riscone di Brunico training camp

Emirates Cup

Birra Moretti Trophy

TIM Trophy

Other friendlies

Competitions

Overview

Serie A

League table

Results summary

Results by round

Matches

Coppa Italia

Round of 16

Quarter-finals

Semi-finals

Final

Supercoppa Italiana

UEFA Champions League

Group stage

Knockout phase

Round of 16

Statistics

Players statistics

Squad statistics
{|class="wikitable" style="text-align: center;"
|-
!
! style="width:70px;"|League
! style="width:70px;"|Europe
! style="width:70px;"|Cup
! style="width:70px;"|Others
! style="width:70px;"|Total Stats
|-
|align=left|Games played       || 38 || 8 || 7 || 1 || 54
|-
|align=left|Games won          || 25 || 5 || 4 || 0 || 34
|-
|align=left|Games drawn        || 10 || 0 || 2 || 0 || 12
|-
|align=left|Games lost         || 3  || 3 || 1 || 1 || 8
|-
|align=left|Goals scored       || 69 ||12 ||15 || 0 || 96
|-
|align=left|Goals conceded     || 26 || 7 || 7 || 1 || 41
|-
|align=left|Goal difference    || 43 || 5 || 8 ||-1 || 55
|-
|align=left|Clean sheets       || 18 || 3 || 3 || 0 || 24
|-
|align=left|Goal by substitute || – || – || – || – || –
|-
|align=left|Total shots        || – || – || – || – || –
|-
|align=left|Shots on target    || – || – || – || – || –
|-
|align=left|Corners            || – || – || – || – || –
|-
|align=left|Players used       || 28|| 24|| 32|| 12|| –
|-
|align=left|Offsides           || – || – || – || –|| –
|-
|align=left|Fouls suffered     || – || – || – || –|| –
|-
|align=left|Fouls committed    || – || – || – || –|| –
|-
|align=left|Yellow cards       || 65|| 12|| 4 || 3|| 84
|-
|align=left|Red cards          || 5 || 4 || – || –|| 9
|-

Goalscorers

Last updated: 24 May 2008

Clean sheets
The list is sorted by shirt number when total appearances are equal.

Last updated: 24 May 2008

References

External links
Official website

Inter Milan seasons
Internazionale
2008